The Akazu (little house) was an informal organization of Hutu extremists whose members contributed strongly to the 1994 Rwandan genocide.  A circle of relatives and close friends of Rwanda's then-president Juvénal Habyarimana and his influential wife Agathe Habyarimana, they were also called the Zero Network, for their goal of a Rwanda with zero Tutsi.

Background
The Akazu were relatives of Habyarimana's and others he knew from his Northern Rwanda district; they held important appointed positions of authority in the Hutu regime. The Akazu did not wish to share government with the Tutsis (particularly the expatriate rebels resident in Uganda) or moderate Hutu.  They contributed to the development of Hutu Power ideology and fanned resentment against the Tutsi during the 1990s.  Some scholars believe their genocidal ideology and massacres were an effort to hold on to the political power they had gathered since Habyarimana came to power in a military coup against the elected government.

Known members
 Protais Zigiranyirazo, former governor of the Ruhengeri prefecture
 Seraphin Rwabukumba, brother-in-law of President Habyarimana
 FAR Colonel Elie Sagatwa
 FAR Colonel Théoneste Bagosora
 FAR Colonel Laurent Serubuga
 Félicien Kabuga, businessman who was the primary financier of the RTLM radio station and Kangura magazine
 Agathe Kanziga, First Lady of Rwanda
  Séraphin Bararengana, head of the Department of Medicine at the University of Rwanda; brother of President Habyarimana
 Charles Nzabagerageza, businessman and shareholder in RTLM radio
 Alphonse Ntirivamunda, son-in-law of President Habyarimana
 Joseph Nzirorera, former speaker of the National Development Council and Minister of Industry, Mines and Handcraft
 Noel Mbonabaryi, uncle of President Habyarimana

External links 
 
 https://books.google.nl/books?id=ceFIryEHTL4C&pg=PA105&lpg=PA105&dq=members+akazu&source=bl&ots=krIrQnLKI2&sig=ACfU3U2fyzgTgFt7x-vVqVfKCnexY0I8MA&hl=nl&sa=X&ved=2ahUKEwinleyS0IHxAhUNkxQKHQ3SANIQ6AEwAXoECAIQAw#v=onepage&q=members%20akazu&f=false

References

People of the Rwandan genocide
Rebel groups in Rwanda